Antonio Marino (born 9 August 1988) is an Italian footballer who plays as a defender for  club Carrarese.

Career
Marino started his career with amateur Eccellenza club Folgore Selinunte from Castelvetrano, until he was noticed by Udinese scout and former Italy international footballer Andrea Carnevale. He successively agreed to join the Primavera under-20 team of Udinese, also serving as team captain throughout the 2007–08 season. He then spent the 2008–09 season on loan to Lega Pro Prima Divisione club Juve Stabia, where he collected 15 first team appearances.

In July 2009 Marino was loaned out again, this time to Serie B outfit Ascoli. After making fourteen appearances in his first full season at Serie B level, his  loan deal was then extended also for the following 2010–11 season.

On 8 July 2019, he signed a 2-year contract with Venezia.

On 29 June 2021, he joined Carrarese on a two-year contract.

References

External links

1988 births
Living people
People from Mazara del Vallo
Footballers from Sicily
Italian footballers
Association football defenders
Association football midfielders
Serie B players
Serie C players
Udinese Calcio players
S.S. Juve Stabia players
Ascoli Calcio 1898 F.C. players
Reggina 1914 players
S.S.D. Varese Calcio players
A.S. Cittadella players
Venezia F.C. players
F.C. Pavia players
Modena F.C. players
U.S. Lecce players
Carrarese Calcio players
Sportspeople from the Province of Trapani